Receptionism is a form of Anglican eucharistic theology which teaches that during the Eucharist the bread and wine remain unchanged after the consecration, but when communicants receive the bread and wine, they also receive the body and blood of Christ by faith. It was a common view among Anglicans in the 16th and 17th centuries, and prominent theologians who subscribed to this doctrine were Thomas Cranmer and Richard Hooker.

Anglicanism
Anglican theologian Claude B. Moss defines receptionism as "the theory that we receive the Body and Blood of Christ when we receive the bread and wine, but they are not identified with the bread and wine which are not changed". It teaches that "the sacramental gift is received by faith", but it has often been misunderstood or misrepresented as teaching that "faith creates the sacrament".

The term itself seems not to have appeared before 1867, but the teaching has roots going back to the English Reformation, particularly to the theology of Thomas Cranmer. Although older authors such as Dix and Gibson describe Cranmer's Eucharistic theology as "Zwinglian", more recent scholars such as MacCulloch, Bates and Beckwith & Tiller class it as "receptionism". In describing Cranmer's changes to the communion service in the 1552 Book of Common Prayer, Colin Buchanan writes, "the only 'moment' is reception—and the only point where the bread and wine signify the body and blood is at reception", when the communicants remembered Christ's offering of himself on the cross. 

It was also held in some form by Richard Hooker. According to him, the bread is unchanged at the blessing of the priest, but becomes an effectual spiritual sign when received by someone in faith.

This Eucharistic teaching was commonly held by 16th and 17th-century Anglican theologians. It was characteristic of 17th century thought to "insist on the real presence of Christ in the Eucharist, but to profess agnosticism concerning the manner of the presence ..." It remained "the dominant theological position in the Church of England until the Oxford Movement in the early nineteenth century, with varying degrees of emphasis".  It is important to remember that it is "a doctrine of the real presence" but one which "relates the presence primarily to the worthy receiver rather than to the elements of bread and wine".

Receptionism rules out the practice of Eucharistic adoration, a practice that in any case most Protestants reject as unscriptural.

Roman Catholic rejection

The 16th-century Council of Trent condemned this teaching, declaring that "if any one saith, that, after the consecration is completed, the body and blood of our Lord Jesus Christ are not in the admirable sacrament of the Eucharist, but (are there) only during the use, whilst it is being taken, and not either before or after; and that, in the hosts, or consecrated particles, which are reserved or which remain after communion, the true Body of the Lord remaineth not; let him be anathema".

The Catholic Church's rejection of receptionism was reaffirmed by Pope Paul VI in his papal encyclical Mysterium fidei of 3 September 1965. Citing Origen, Hippolytus of Rome, Novatian and Cyril of Alexandria, he stated: "The Catholic Church has always displayed and still displays this latria that ought to be paid to the Sacrament of the Eucharist, both during Mass and outside of it, by taking the greatest possible care of consecrated Hosts, by exposing them to the solemn veneration of the faithful, and by carrying them about in processions to the joy of great numbers of the people."

Receptionism among Lutheran theologians
The traditional position regarding the real presence of Christ in the Eucharist in Lutheranism is the sacramental union: the consecrated bread is united with the body of Christ and the consecrated wine is united with the blood of Christ by virtue of Christ's original institution with the result that anyone eating and drinking these "elements"—the consecrated bread and wine—really eats and drinks the physical body and blood of Christ as well.

References

Anglican Eucharistic theology
Eucharist